Tomáš Kóňa (born 1 March 1984) is a Slovak football midfielder who currently plays for Spartak Myjava.

Club career
Kóňa, a native of Nitra, began playing football at the local club FC Nitra. He made his debut for the senior team in the 2003–04 Second Division season. After Nitra's promotion to the Corgoň Liga in 2005, he took part in every match until his transfer to Sparta Praha in January 2006.

He made his debut for Sparta against Příbram on 19 August 2006. He played 10 matches in 2006–07 and only one match in 2007–08 due to fracture of his leg. After his treatment he moved to Zlín on a half-year loan in July 2008.

In February 2009, he moved on half-year loan to Artmedia Petržalka. He appeared in 14 league matches and scored one goal. He played in the 2008–09 Slovak Cup Final where they lost against Košice.

In July 2009, he came back to Nitra on a one-year loan and helped them to qualify at the 2010–11 UEFA Europa League, scoring 4 goals in 30 matches.

In July 2010, he moved to Senica on a one-year loan. He showed good performance for Senica that finished second in 2010–11 and he has signed a 2-year contract in July 2011.

International career
Kóňa made his national team debut in a 1–0 away win against Andorra on 26 March 2011.

Honours

Sparta Praha
Gambrinus liga (1): 2006–07
Czech Cup (2): 2006–07, 2007–08

External links
 FK Senica profile

References

1984 births
Living people
Sportspeople from Nitra
Association football midfielders
Slovak footballers
Slovakia international footballers
FC Nitra players
AC Sparta Prague players
FC Fastav Zlín players
FC Petržalka players
FK Senica players
Spartak Myjava players
ŠK Slovan Bratislava players
Slovak Super Liga players
Czech First League players
Slovak expatriate footballers
Expatriate footballers in the Czech Republic
Slovak expatriate sportspeople in the Czech Republic